Oghwevwri is an emulsified palm oil soup eaten by the Urhobo people of Southern Nigeria. The name "Oghwevwri" means "oil soup" It is prepared with smoked or dried fish, meat, pepper, crayfish, potash and palm oil . It is usually eaten with eba, usi (starch) or yam. Oghwevwri is a special soup given to guests in marriages, funerals and other traditional events.

See also
 List of soups

References

Nigerian soups